Ames Broadcasting Company, also "Lake City Broadcasting" was formed under the owner Betty Baudler Horras, who started out as a bookkeeper before becoming the first woman to own a radio station in Iowa. The small company owned and operated 3 radio stations in West Central Iowa. KCYZ, KASI-AM, KIKD-FM were owned by Ames or Lake City Broadcasting Company, but later sold. KCYZ (then KCCQ), KASI-AM radio stations that were located in Ames, Iowa were sold to Jacor that merged with Clear Channel Communications for an unspecified amount. KIKD-FM radio station located in Lake City, Iowa was sold to Carroll Broadcasting Company. Betty Baudler currently is the owner of Sign Pro and president of Baudler Enterprises.

Defunct radio broadcasting companies of the United States
Companies based in Iowa
Defunct companies based in Iowa